Xavier Johnsai Munyongani (1 January 1950 – 15 October 2017) was a Roman Catholic bishop.

Ordained to the priesthood in 1977, Munyongani served as bishop of the Roman Catholic Diocese of Gweru, Zimbabwe, from 2013 until his death in 2017.

See also
Catholic Church in Zimbabwe

Notes

1950 births
2017 deaths
Rhodesian Roman Catholic priests
21st-century Roman Catholic bishops in Zimbabwe
Roman Catholic bishops of Gweru